The Holy Bible is a collection of religious texts

The Holy Bible may also refer to:

 The Holy Bible (album), a 1994 album by the band Manic Street Preachers
 The Holy Bible: A Purified Translation, a 2000 edition of the New Testament

See also